Benjamin Maximilian Lundt (born 24 September 1995) is a German footballer who plays as a goalkeeper for St. Louis City SC of Major League Soccer.

Career
Lundt was selected by FC Cincinnati with the 37th selection in the 2019 MLS SuperDraft.

On 9 February 2019, Lundt joined USL Championship side Louisville City FC on loan ahead of the 2019 season.

On 6 May 2021, Lundt joined Phoenix Rising FC for the 2021 USL Championship season.

Following the 2021 season, Cincinnati declined their contract option on Lundt. Lundt then signed a multi-year contract with Phoenix Rising FC on January 24, 2022.

In January 2023, he joined St Louis City SC in Major League Soccer.

Honours
Individual
USL Championship All League First Team: 2020

USL Championship Goalkeeper Of The Year: 2020

References

External links
Profile at Akron Athletics

1995 births
Living people
German footballers
Footballers from Berlin
Association football goalkeepers
Regionalliga players
USL League Two players
Major League Soccer players
USL Championship players
Hertha BSC II players
Lenoir–Rhyne Bears men's soccer players
Akron Zips men's soccer players
Reading United A.C. players
FC Cincinnati draft picks
FC Cincinnati players
Louisville City FC players
Phoenix Rising FC players
German expatriate footballers
German expatriate sportspeople in the United States
Expatriate soccer players in the United States